Rochester Street Historic District is a national historic district located at  Scottsville in Monroe County, New York. The district encompasses 41 residential structures, over half of which date from the 1830s through 1850s and are distinct examples of Greek Revival architecture.

It was listed on the National Register of Historic Places in 1973.

References

Historic districts on the National Register of Historic Places in New York (state)
Historic districts in Monroe County, New York
National Register of Historic Places in Monroe County, New York